Inhacamba (Ilha Inhacamba) is an island in Mozambique. It is situated at the mouth of the Zambezi River.

Islands of Mozambique